Craig Nicholas Stammen (born March 9, 1984) is an American professional baseball pitcher in the San Diego Padres organization. He has played in Major League Baseball (MLB) for the Washington Nationals.

Amateur career
Stammen started his career in the North Star Little League, a small community-based league that fostered the development of fellow standout Cory Luebke. Stammen is a graduate of Versailles High School where he played football, basketball, and baseball. He was named to the all-Miami Valley baseball team and was awarded Academic All-Ohio honors in 2002. He attended the University of Dayton, where he majored in entrepreneurship and business management and made 60 pitching appearances over three seasons, as well as pitching in the Great Lakes Summer Collegiate League in 2004. He was an Atlantic 10 Conference Academic All-Conference Pick in 2005. While at Dayton, Stammen was teammates with fellow pitcher and future Nationals teammate Jerry Blevins. On May 19, 2006, he was elected a member of "UDLegends", an association of the most renowned and respected graduates of University of Dayton.

Professional career

Washington Nationals
Stammen was selected by the Washington Nationals in the twelfth round of the 2005 Major League Baseball draft and was assigned to the Vermont Expos of the short-season Single-A New York–Penn League. He made seven starts and six relief appearances, accruing an ERA of 4.06 while striking out 32 batters and allowing 12 walks and 62 hits over 51 innings.

In 2006 Stammen pitched for the Savannah Sand Gnats of the low Single-A South Atlantic League and for the Potomac Nationals of the advanced Single-A Carolina League. In 143 innings he accumulated a 4.03 ERA and struck out 109 batters while allowing 36 walks and 144 hits.

Most of Stammen's 2007 season was spent at Potomac, although he did make one appearance with the Columbus Clippers of the Triple-A International League. He pitched a total of 128⅔ innings, striking out 98 batters and yielding 57 walks and 160 hits on the way to a 4.41 ERA.

Stammen's duties in 2008 were divided among Potomac, the Harrisburg Senators of the Double-A Eastern League, and Columbus. He posted an ERA of 3.52 over 150⅔ innings, striking out 128 batters while giving up 44 walks and 143 hits. He was a member of the Carolina League Mid-Season All-Star team. On July 14 he was named Eastern League Pitcher of the Week.

Stammen started off the year with the Triple-A Syracuse Chiefs, going 4–2 with a 1.80 ERA (through 20 May 2009). He was called up to the major leagues on May 20, 2009. He had his first major league start May 21 versus the Pittsburgh Pirates and pitched 6 innings with no decision. His first major league win was June 18 versus the New York Yankees. Stammen pitched 6 innings and allowed no runs. On July 11, 2009, he pitched his first major league complete game against the Houston Astros, allowing only 2 runs on 9 hits.

Stammen continued to pitch in the starting rotation, going 4–7 with a 5.11 ERA in 19 starts, until the beginning of September when he was scratched from his scheduled September 4 start because of a sore elbow. An MRI on September 3 revealed a bone spur in the back of his right (pitching) elbow. Arthroscopic surgery was performed on September 6 and Stammen recovered in time for spring training in 2010.

After recovering from a season-ending arthroscopic surgery in September 2009 and having a successful spring training, Stammen returned to the Nationals' rotation as their number 3 starter for the 2010 season.

On June 7, Stammen was optioned to the Triple-A Syracuse Chiefs to make room on the active roster for starting pitcher Stephen Strasburg, the overall #1 draft pick in the 2009 Major League Baseball Draft.

On June 29, after going 2–0 with a 2.25 ERA in three starts for the Chiefs (the last of which he came within one out of throwing a seven-inning no-hitter, Stammen was recalled to the Nationals and returned to the starting rotation. The following night he pitched 7 innings, allowing two runs on five hits, against the first place-Atlanta Braves, stopping a Nats' 5-game losing streak in a 7–2 win.

On August 8, Stammen was assigned to the bullpen to make way in the starting rotation for Jason Marquis and Stephen Strasburg.

After spending spring training with the Nationals, Stammen was optioned to Triple-A Syracuse for the start of the 2011 season (though remaining on the Nationals' 40-man roster).

Stammen rejoined the Nationals from June 4–14 while Doug Slaten was on the 15-day disabled list. During this brief stint, he pitched 2 innings of relief in two games and was the losing pitcher in one of them.

After spending most of the summer with Syracuse, Stammen was called up again on September 6.

After a successful spring training, Stammen made the Nationals' 2012 opening day roster, serving as a long reliever.

Stammen recorded his first career save on September 29, in a 10-inning victory against the St. Louis Cardinals.

On May 31, 2013, Stammen came in after Stephen Strasburg left with an apparent injury after the second inning. Stammen pitched four innings of perfect baseball: no hits, no runs, no walks, with three strikeouts for the win against division-leading Atlanta Braves.

On December 3, 2015, Stammen was non-tendered by the Nationals.

Cleveland Indians
On February 8, 2016, Stammen signed a minor league contract with the Cleveland Indians. He elected free agency after the 2016 season.

San Diego Padres
On December 23, 2016, Stammen signed a minor league contract with the San Diego Padres. On March 30, 2017, Stammen was added to the Padres' 25-man active roster, where he joined the team as a reliever. Stammen pitched 1.0 innings on April 3, his first major league appearance since April 14, 2015. He was effective throughout the season, posting an ERA of 3.15 in  innings.

On January 7, 2018, Stammen signed a two-year contract with the Padres. In 2018, he was 8–3 in a career high 73 appearances.

On June 9, 2019, facing his former team the Nationals, he gave up four consecutive home runs, to Howie Kendrick, then Trea Turner, then Adam Eaton, and then Anthony Rendon.

In 2019 he led the major leagues in blown saves (9), and tied for the major league lead in holds (31).

On January 17, 2020, Stammen re-signed with the Padres on a two-year, $9MM contract with a club option for the 2022 season. In the pandemic shortened season, Stammen recorded a 4–2 record and a 5.63 ERA with 20 strikeouts and 4 walks in 24 innings pitched in the same number of games.

In 2021, Stammen posted a 6–3 record and 3.06 ERA with 83 strikeouts and 13 walks in  innings across 67 appearances. Stammen made 33 appearances for San Diego in 2022, logging a 1-2 record and 4.43 ERA with 35 strikeouts in 40.2 innings pitched.

On January 11, 2023, Stammen re-signed with the Padres on a minor league contract. On March 10, Stammen suffered a torn capsule in his right shoulder and a strained sub scapula, with both injuries being related to the torn rotator cuff he suffered in 2022. The injury caused Stammen to contemplate retirement, as the recovery timetable was set at four-to-six months without surgery.

Pitching style
Stammen is a sinkerballer. His sinker is thrown in the 90–93 mph range and is used especially frequently against left-handed hitters. Against right-handed batters, Stammen pairs his sinker with a slider in the mid 80s. The sinker is useful in inducing ground balls, while the slider is a good option for compiling strikeouts — it has a whiff rate of 46% for his career and is the pitch most responsible for his career strikeouts. Additionally, he has a curveball that is used frequently in two-strike counts, especially against left-handers. He also throws a four-seam fastball.

Personal life

Stammen is a devout Roman Catholic. He spoke of his faith in this 2013 interview with the National Catholic Register.

Audrey and Craig Stammen were married on January 21, 2017, at Holy Angels Catholic Church in Dayton, Ohio. The newlyweds honeymooned in Hawaii where his new wife hit a hole-in-one on the final day of their stay. Their first child, a son named Chase, was born on March 20, 2018.

In 2012, Stammen took his first trip to Afghanistan to visit military personnel. Stammen's work with the United States Military is partially due to some of his college friends joining the Army and Marines. His support of the military has continued throughout his Major League Baseball career. In recognition of all his efforts to the military, he was the Major League Baseball recipient of the Bob Feller Act of Valor Award, in 2020.

References

External links

 University of Dayton baseball team biography

1984 births
Living people
Baseball players from Ohio
Columbus Clippers players
Dayton Flyers baseball players
Harrisburg Senators players
Major League Baseball pitchers
People from Darke County, Ohio
Potomac Nationals players
San Diego Padres players
Savannah Sand Gnats players
Vermont Lake Monsters players
Washington Nationals players
Catholics from Ohio